XHRJ-FM is a radio station in Toluca, State of Mexico. Broadcasting on 92.5 FM, XHRJ is owned by Grupo ACIR and carries its Amor romantic music format.

History
XHRJ received its concession on August 15, 1980. It was owned by Javier Ramírez González until 1981, when it was sold to Corporación Radiofónica de Toluca.

References

Radio stations in the State of Mexico
Grupo ACIR